Cambridge Blackfriars is a priory of the Dominican Order in Cambridgeshire, England. It was established in 1238, dissolved in 1538 and re-established in 1938. It continues to operate as a Dominican priory and, in 2000, became the novitiate house of the English Province of the Order of Preachers.

The new site is at Buckingham Road, Cambridge, close to Murray Edwards College. Two existing houses were linked by a new wing in 1961-2 designed by David Roberts. The original house was offered to the Order in 1938 by the widow of Professor Edward Bullough. The second house, Howfield, the family home of Arthur Stanley Ramsey, was bought in 1955.

The medieval Dominican Friary was founded before 1238. At the time of its dissolution in 1538, there was a prior and fifteen others. The last prior Gregory Dodds was later Dean of Exeter. A friar John Scory in 1551 became a bishop in the Church of England. Emmanuel College was founded on the site in 1584 and the college's Front Court incorporates 14th-century work from the Friary, in the North Range and Hall.

The statue of the virgin and child now in the Church of Our Lady and the English Martyrs in Cambridge is reputed to have been in the Dominican Friary before the dissolution. In 1538 John Hilsey sent Gregory Dodds to Thomas Cromwell, Henry VIII's chief minister, to request that the image of Our Lady of Grace be removed from the friary. The statue now in the church is said to have been discovered in Emmanuel College in 1850.

References

External links
Official site of the priory
English Province of the Order of Preachers site

Monasteries in Cambridgeshire
1258 establishments in England
Christian monasteries established in the 13th century
1538 disestablishments in England
1938 establishments in England
20th-century Christian monasteries
Dominican monasteries in England
Christianity in Cambridge
Buildings and structures in Cambridge
History of Cambridge